The 6th National Assembly of the Federal Republic of Nigeria was a bicameral legislature inaugurated on 5 June 2007 and ran its course till 6 June 2011. The assembly comprises the Senate and the House of Representatives.
360 representatives were elected as member of the House of Representative while 109 members were elected as member of the senate, making a total of 469 members all together.

Presiding officers
The Senate President presides over the Senate, the higher chamber while the Speaker presides over the House of Representatives.

David Mark  was elected Senate President on the platform of People's Democratic Party and Dimeji Bankole, the Speaker of the House of Representatives succeeded Patricia Etteh, who was forced to resign on alleged mismanagement of funds.

References

External links 

 Official website of the Nigerian National Assembly 
 Assemblyonline news on the National Assembly
 Official People and Legislature Information Interchange

Politics of Nigeria
6th
Nigeria
2007 in Nigeria
2008 in Nigeria
2009 in Nigeria
2010 in Nigeria
2011 in Nigeria